Eupithecia karenae is a moth in the family Geometridae. It is found in coastal California and Arizona.

The wingspan is 19–22 mm. The forewings are rich golden or red brown. The hindwings are paler. It was the first new species identified by the hobby Lepidopterist Ronald Leuschner, and named for his eldest daughter, Karen.

References

Moths described in 1966
karenae
Moths of North America